Carex macrocephala, the big-head sedge or largehead sedge, is a species of flowering plant in the family Cyperaceae. It is found on the beaches and dunes of the northern Pacific; Japan, Primorsky Krai, Sakhalin, the Kurils and Kamchatka in the Russian Far East, and Alaska, British Columbia, Washington state and Oregon in North America.

References

macrocephala
Flora of Japan
Flora of Primorsky Krai
Flora of Sakhalin
Flora of the Kuril Islands
Flora of Kamchatka Krai
Flora of Alaska
Flora of British Columbia
Flora of Washington (state)
Flora of Oregon
Plants described in 1826